306 Hollywood is a 2018 documentary film directed by the brother-and-sister team of Jonathan and Elan Bogarín. It is about their experiences cleaning out their grandmother's house after her death. It was filmed on location in Hillside, New Jersey.

References

External links
 
 
 

2018 films
Hillside, New Jersey
Films shot in New Jersey
Documentary films about women
Documentary films about old age
Documentary films about death
Documentary films about fashion designers
2010s English-language films